Tinnhølen or Tinnhylen is a lake in Norway that lies in the municipality of Eidfjord in Vestland county and a very small part crosses into the municipality of Nore og Uvdal in Viken county.  The lake lies just inside Hardangervidda National Park on the vast Hardangervidda plateau.  The northern part of the lake is accessible by road.

See also
List of lakes in Norway

References

Lakes of Vestland
Lakes of Viken (county)
Eidfjord
Nore og Uvdal